Higdon may refer to:

People
 Allan Higdon (born 1947), former mayor of Ottawa, Canada
 Hal Higdon (born 1931), American writer and runner
 Jennifer Higdon (born 1962), an American composer of classical music and composition teacher.
 Karan Higdon (born 1996), American football player
 Ranulf Higdon (1280-1364), English chronicler and monk
J.H. Higdon (1883-1964), El Paso Texas pioneer and realtor
 Michael Higdon (born 1983), English professional footballer

Places
 Higdon, Alabama, United States

Companies
 HigdonBraddockMatthews LLC, a New York City-based executive search firm
 Janie Higdon (born 1971), American accountant and historian

See also
 Higden